The Scottish League Cup (also known as the Viaplay Cup for sponsorship reasons) is a football competition open to all Scottish Professional Football League (SPFL) clubs. First held in 1946–47, it is the oldest national League cup in existence. The competition had a straight knockout format but became a group and knockout competition from 2016–17.

Rangers are the record holders of the cup, winning 27 times. Celtic are the holders, winning their 21st title after beating Rangers 2–1 at Hampden Park on 26 February 2023.

The domestic television rights are held by Viaplay, whose predecessor company Premier Sports replaced BT Sport from the 2019–20 season.

Format
Historically, the Scottish League Cup has oscillated between being a straightforward single-elimination knockout tournament and having an initial group phase. Since the 2016–17 season, the League Cup has used a group phase format. The format has eight groups of five teams playing each other once in a round-robin format. The forty teams playing in the group stage consist of the 38 league clubs who are not participating in UEFA competitions, along with two teams from outside the league. In the group phase, three points are given for a win and one point for a draw. If matches are level after ninety minutes, a penalty shoot-out is held with the winning team gaining a bonus point. The groups are regionalised: there are four groups in the North section, and four in the South section, with three pots for each regional section – top seeds, second seeds, and unseeded clubs. Each group will consist of one top seed, one second seed, and three unseeded clubs.

The eight group winners and three best runners-up progress into the second round, where they are joined by the five clubs participating in UEFA competitions. The tournament then adopts a single-elimination knockout format. There are no replays, which means all drawn matches are decided by extra time and a penalty shootout, if necessary. The semi-final matches are played on a neutral ground, determined by the location and size of supports involved. The final game is traditionally played at Hampden Park in Glasgow, though due to renovations some finals have been played at other venues, such as Celtic Park or Ibrox Stadium. The new format also allowed the SPFL to reintroduce the two-weekend winter break in January. Along with the newly designed tournament, a new television deal for it was announced as BT Sport took over rights from BBC Scotland. In February 2016 the SPFL announced the League Cup final would be moved to November.

History 
The cup has its origins in a regional cup competition called the Southern League Cup which was introduced in 1940 when wartime restrictions led to a suspension of the Scottish Cup. This tournament was largely regional and did not involve all of the teams who comprised the Scottish Football League prior to the outbreak of war. The first official Scottish Football League Cup was contested during the 1946–47 season, when Rangers defeated Aberdeen in the final.

The competition was very popular with supporters during the first few decades of its existence. The tournament consisted of 8 or 9 groups consisting of 4 or 5 teams. The groups were seeded into 2 sets with the top 16 teams in Division 1 making up the first four groups. This guaranteed that 4 'top' teams would play 4 'lesser' teams in the quarter-finals.

Extra games when the Premier League was formed and expanded European competitions meant that by the early 1980s, its long-winded format, which involved group rounds played early in the season leading to two-legged knock-out rounds, attracted much criticism. In the mid-1980s the tournament was revamped to a shorter, single elimination knock-out format with a final played prior to Christmas, which provided the excitement of a cup final early in the season.

During the 1999–2000 competition, the semi-finals and final were moved to the springtime to avoid the congestion of fixtures caused by the early rounds of the UEFA club competitions and Scotland's representatives in Europe were given automatic byes until the third round of competition.

From the 2016–17 edition the League Cup reverted to a group stage format, with single-elimination knock-out in the last 16 onwards.

Previous finals

Sponsorship
The League Cup has been known by different names due to sponsorship:

Trophy 
Since the competition's inception, the winning team has been awarded the three-handled trophy known as the Scottish Football League Cup. However, during the 1980s when Skol lager sponsored the competition, a second trophy known as the Skol Cup was awarded as well. After the 1987–88 competition when Rangers won their third Skol Cup, they were given the trophy permanently and a new Skol Cup with a slightly different design was introduced the following season.

It was long term Clyde and then Scottish Football League chairman John McMahon who donated the trophy that is still awarded to the winners of the competition to this day.

European qualification 
Until 1995, the winners of the Scottish League Cup were granted a place in the UEFA Cup, although this privilege was rarely invoked as the winning teams usually qualified for Europe by some other means, such as winning the League Championship or Scottish Cup. The final example of this was Raith Rovers who represented Scotland in the 1995–96 UEFA Cup after winning the League Cup the previous season as a First Division club. Since this privilege has been discontinued, some winners have missed out on European football qualification the following season, including 2015–16 winners Ross County who have still never qualified for European football in their history. Additionally Ross County and East Fife are the only League Cup winners to have never played in a UEFA club competition.

Performance by club

Media coverage
Scottish League Cup matches are shown live by Viaplay in the United Kingdom and Ireland. In Australia, the Scottish League Cup is broadcast by beIN Sports. The 2009 Scottish League Cup Final was shown live on SBS due to a fixture clash on previous hosts' Setanta channel. In sub-Saharan Africa, the Scottish League Cup matches are shown live by ESPN

List of broadcasters

Notes

References

External links
  

 
League Cup
2
National association football league cups
League Cup
1946 establishments in Scotland
Recurring sporting events established in 1946